Duncan George Gifford (born 26 November 1972) is an Australian-born award-winning concert pianist and teacher. He has been a professor of piano at the Conservatory of Palma in Majorca since 2006. Musica Viva describes him as a "major artist of his generation". The Sydney Morning Herald described him as "a virtuosic and musically eloquent soloist".

Early life
Gifford was born in Sydney and educated at Newington College (1985–1990), the Sydney Conservatorium of Music and in Russia at the Moscow Conservatory.

Piano competitions
Gifford's impressive record of international music competition awards began in 1989, when he was a finalist in the ABC Symphony Australia Young Performers Awards.  In 1992 he won the 3rd Prize in the Sydney International Piano Competition.  He was the highest placed Australian competitor in the history of the competition (this has since been equalled by Daniel Hill, who placed 3rd at the 2004 competition).  He won 4th Prize in the 1994 Dublin International Piano Competition and 3rd Prize in the 1996 Montreal International Piano Competition. He was awarded 1st Prize, and the Beethoven and Chopin Prizes, in the 1998 José Iturbi International Piano Competition in Spain, 1st Prize in the 1999 Concours Prix Mozart in Lausanne, and 1st Prize in the 2000 Maria Callas Grand Prix de Piano in Athens.

Performance career
Gifford has performed with orchestras and in recitals throughout Europe, Russia, Japan, Australasia, and in the United States where he gave his Carnegie Hall debut recital in 1999. In 1993 he released his first CD featuring the music of Tchaikovsky and Rachmaninoff.

Teaching career
Since 1996, Gifford has been based in Madrid, where he is professor of piano.

Awards and nominations

ARIA Music Awards
The ARIA Music Awards is an annual awards ceremony that recognises excellence, innovation, and achievement across all genres of Australian music. They commenced in 1987. 

! 
|-
| 1995
| Debussy Preludes Books I & II
| Best Classical Album
| 
| 
|-

References

1972 births
Living people
Australian classical pianists
Male classical pianists
People educated at Newington College
Sydney Conservatorium of Music alumni
Sydney International Piano Competition prize-winners
Moscow Conservatory alumni
José Iturbi International Piano Competition prize-winners
Australian music educators
Piano pedagogues
21st-century classical pianists
21st-century Australian male musicians
21st-century Australian musicians